Xylosma peltata is a species of flowering plant in the family Salicaceae. It is endemic to New Caledonia.

References

Endemic flora of New Caledonia
peltata
Critically endangered plants
Taxonomy articles created by Polbot
Taxa named by Hermann Otto Sleumer